Matthew Varey (born 1968 in Hamilton, Ontario) is a Canadian artist and educator. He was educated at McMaster University (BFA, 1992) and D'Youville College (Ed.Cert., 2004). He lives and works in Toronto and is currently the Head of Contemporary Art at Etobicoke School of the Arts. In 2016 he was awarded the Canadian Society for Education through Arts' 'Canadian Art Educator of the Year Award (Grades 9–12)'.

Career 
In 1991, Varey served as the director of the Carnegie Gallery in Hamilton, Ontario while concurrently maintaining an active studio practise upon graduation from McMaster University in 1992. Varey exhibited widely in southern Ontario from 1988, before showing internationally for the first time in 1995 at the International Arts Center in Hiroshima, Japan. During his career as an artist, Varey has exhibited around the world at Mati Gallery in Greece, Art Forum Berlin in Germany, Art Miami in the United States, and at Fondazione Bevilacqua La Masa in Italy.

In 2004, Varey started teaching Visual Art at Etobicoke School of the Arts, and was shortly thereafter appointed as Head of Visual Art in 2007. He remains in this position and has restructured the program into the new 'Contemporary Art Department', refocusing the curricular focus onto bringing contemporary studio-based practise into the classroom.

He is currently Head of Contemporary at Etobicoke School of the Arts and an active artist.

Public and corporate collections (selected) 
 Art Gallery of Hamilton, Hamilton, Ontario
 The McMaster Museum of Art, Hamilton, Canada
 Cenovus Energy, Calgary, Canada
 The Donovan Collection, Toronto, Canada
 Bell Canada, Toronto, Canada
 Sunnybrook Hospital, Toronto, Canada
 Wilfrid Laurier University, Waterloo, Canada
 Vancouver Stock Exchange, Vancouver, Canada
 McCullough, O’Connor, Irwin, Vancouver, Canada
 The Tragically Hip, Kingston, Ontario
 Estate of Farley Mowat, Port Hope, Ontario

References

External links 
 matthewvarey.com
 McMaster Museum of Art

1968 births
Living people
Canadian contemporary artists
Artists from Hamilton, Ontario
D'Youville College alumni
McMaster University alumni
21st-century Canadian artists